The 18th edition of the Men's Asian Amateur Boxing Championships were held from October 1 to October 8, 1995, in Tashkent, Uzbekistan.

Medal summary

Medal table

References

amateur-boxing

External links
Asian Boxing Confederation

1995
Asian Boxing
Boxing
20th century in Tashkent
Sport in Tashkent